Vetovo is a town in northeastern Bulgaria, part of Ruse Province. It is the administrative centre of Vetovo Municipality, which lies in the eastern part of the area, and ranks third in population in the province after Ruse and Byala. The town is located 40 kilometres away from the provincial capital - Ruse. As of December 2009, Vetovo has a population of 4,777 inhabitants.

The population of Vetovo mainly consists of Bulgarians, Turks, Crimean Tatars and Romani (both Christian and Muslim). Besides Eastern Orthodox Christians and Muslims, Vetovo also has an Evangelical congregation.

Municipality

Vetovo municipality has an area of 352 square kilometres and includes the following 7 places:

Besides Vetovo, the municipality includes two other towns: Senovo and Glodzhevo, with the other localities being villages.

References

External links
 Vetovo municipality website 
 Vetovo municipality page at the Ruse Province website 

Towns in Bulgaria
Populated places in Ruse Province